José Arnulfo Castorena Vélez (born 27 May 1978) is a Mexican Paralympic swimmer who competes in international elite events. He is a double Paralympic champion, five-time Parapan American Games champion and a five-time World champion.

Castorena was born with underdeveloped legs and a missing left arm. He had a difficult upbringing when his mother died after giving birth to him, his father abandoned him and his grandmother looked after him until she died when Castorena was of a young age.

References

1978 births
Living people
Sportspeople from Guadalajara, Jalisco
Paralympic swimmers of Mexico
Swimmers at the 2000 Summer Paralympics
Swimmers at the 2004 Summer Paralympics
Swimmers at the 2008 Summer Paralympics
Swimmers at the 2012 Summer Paralympics
Swimmers at the 2016 Summer Paralympics
Swimmers at the 2020 Summer Paralympics
Medalists at the 2000 Summer Paralympics
Medalists at the 2004 Summer Paralympics
Medalists at the 2012 Summer Paralympics
Medalists at the 2020 Summer Paralympics
Medalists at the 2011 Parapan American Games
Medalists at the 2019 Parapan American Games
Medalists at the World Para Swimming Championships
Mexican male freestyle swimmers
Mexican male medley swimmers
Mexican male breaststroke swimmers
S4-classified Paralympic swimmers
21st-century Mexican people